Frederick William Terence "Tom" Davey (15 November 1916 – 26 March 1978) was an Australian rules footballer who played with Hawthorn in the Victorian Football League (VFL).

After his brief football career Davey served in World War II, enlisting in April 1943 and serving until the end of the war.

Notes

External links 

1916 births
1978 deaths
Hawthorn Football Club players
Australian Army personnel of World War II
Australian Army soldiers
Australian rules footballers from Albury
Military personnel from New South Wales